The 12th Michigan Infantry Regiment was an infantry regiment that served in the Union Army during the American Civil War.

Service
The 12th Michigan Infantry was organized at Niles, Dowagiac, and Buchanan, Michigan, and was mustered into Federal service for a three-year enlistment between December 9, 1861, and March 5, 1862 .

The regiment was mustered out on February 15, 1866.

Total strength and casualties
The regiment suffered 1 officer and 52 enlisted men who were killed in action or mortally wounded and 3 officers and 372 enlisted men who died of disease, for a total of 428
fatalities.

Commanders
 Colonel Francis Quinn
 Colonel William Graves
 Colonel Dwight May

See also
List of Michigan Civil War Units
Michigan in the American Civil War

Notes

References
The Civil War Archive

Units and formations of the Union Army from Michigan
1865 disestablishments in Michigan
Military units and formations disestablished in 1865
Military units and formations established in 1861
1861 establishments in Michigan
Military units and formations disestablished in 1866